

C

References

Lists of words